= Bowling at the 2010 South American Games – Men's all events singles =

Event at the 2010 South American Games

The Men's all events singles event at the 2010 South American Games was the sum of the four previous competitions, and served as a qualifying to the Master event, qualifying the top 16.

== Medalists ==
Gold	Silver	Bronze
Manuel Otalora; Colombia	Jaime González; Colombia	Rafael Eduardo Medina; Venezuela

== Results ==
Rank	Athlete	Results				Total	Avg	Q
Rank	Athlete	Singles	Doubles	Trios/ Mixed	Teams	Total	Avg	Q
1st place, gold medalist(s)	Manuel Otalora (COL)	1374	1129	1337	1170	5010	208.75	Q
2nd place, silver medalist(s)	Jaime González (COL)	1319	1139	1232	1273	4963	206.79	Q
3rd place, bronze medalist(s)	Rafael Eduardo Medina (VEN)	1291	1041	1365	1225	4922	205.08	Q
4	Andrés Gómez (COL)	1361	1167	1256	1135	4919	204.96	Q
5	David Romero (COL)	1300	1147	1292	1172	4911	204.62	Q
6	Ildemaro Ricardo Ruiz (VEN)	1345	1194	1133	1172	4844	201.83	Q
7	Juliano Oliveira (BRA)	1214	1175	1295	1138	4822	200.92	Q
8	Jonatha Ariel Hocsman (ARG)	1305	1040	1372	1020	4737	197.38	Q
9	Luis Richard Olivo (VEN)	1196	1175	1257	1099	4727	196.96	Q
10	Diogenes Jose Borja (ECU)	1118	1094	1237	1173	4622	192.58	Q
11	Danny Fung Sun (VEN)	1161	1100	1214	1146	4621	192.54	Q
12	Luis Felipe Gonzalez (CHI)	1194	1048	1262	1068	4572	190.50	Q
13	Alejandro Kelly Carricarte (PAR)	1229	963	1304	1043	4539	89.12	Q
14	Emiel Samander (AHO)	1339	985	1143	1069	4536	189.00	Q
15	Ricardo Javier Rosa (ARG)	1268	1033	1163	1066	4530	188.75	Q
16	Adrian Reyes Vargas (CHI)	1234	1035	1217	1043	4529	188.71	Q
17	Charles Robini (BRA)	1269	1114	1151	995	4529	188.71	
18	Marcio Vieira (BRA)	1159	1165	1124	1076	4524	188.50	
19	Sebastian Montalbetti (ARG)	1232	877	1303	1091	4503	187.62	
20	Carlos Finx (AHO)	1184	1136	1150	1026	4496	187.33	
21	Adolfo Edgardo Chang (PER)	1095	1146	1191	1064	4496	187.33	
22	Ignacio Rojas Patino (BOL)	1313	909	1223	1009	4454	185.58	
23	Harold Andrés Pickering (CHI)	1264	1004	1141	1026	4435	184.79	
24	Sebastian Nemtala Garcia (BOL)	1325	1026	1141	926	4418	184.08	
25	Jason Odor (ARU)	1085	1119	1148	1049	4401	183.38	
26	Walter Costa (BRA)	1242	1034	1125	966	4367	181.96	
27	Eduardo Fujinaka (PER)	1140	1115	1161	945	4361	181.71	
28	Pablo Hinojosa Rojas (BOL)	1161	962	1173	1050	4346	181.06	
29	Pablo Alejandro Pohl (CHI)	1097	991	1264	966	4318	179.92	
30	Christian Fernando Dalmasso (ARG)	1192	819	1257	1028	4296	179.00	
31	Laurence Wilming (ARU)	1198	963	1123	977	4261	177.54	
32	Oscar Guillermo Candia (BOL)	1046	1035	1120	1033	4234	176.42	
33	Errol Brown (ARU)	1018	1022	1127	1054	4221	175.88	
34	Jorge Luis Perez (ECU)	1061	1074	1034	1033	4202	175.08	
35	Victor Ricardo Takechi (PER)	1018	1069	1068	1039	4194	174.75	
36	Jorge Luis Alarcon (PAR)	1195	961	1128	885	4169	173.71	
37	Nelson Kelly (ARU)	1069	1011	1029	1023	4123	172.17	
38	Tarik Samander (AHO)	1097	1020	1096	859	4072	169.67	
39	Denis Richard Toyoda (PER)	1212	918	1071	856	4057	169.04	
40	Felix Ibañez (AHO)	1036	1005	975	993	4009	167.04	
41	Alejandro Ignacio Lopez (PAR)	1065	874	1031	894	3864	161.00	
42	Chieh Hsiao Tzu (PAR)	1056	827	1106	858	3847	160.29	
